Loma de Cabrera is the second largest city in the province of Dajabón, Dominican Republic. It is located in the northwest portion of the country, in the Cibao region.

The river named Dajabón, also known as Masacre, runs through Loma de Cabrera. The same river separates the city of Dajabon from Haiti. Loma de Cabrera  has a very popular river falls called "Balneario El Salto", which is a very popular tourist place for Dominican residents.
 
Loma de Cabrera is the birthplace of well-known merengue artist Fernando "El Mayimbe" Villalona, Rafael Furcal, the former Major League Baseball shortstop, the poet Cristino Gómez, painter Juan Andújar, and baseball outfielder Julio Rodríguez.

Notable people
 Juan Andújar - (b 1986) is a Dominican artist
 Rafael Furcal -  (b 1977) is a Dominican former professional baseball shortstop
 Cristino Gómez - (b 1987) is a Dominican poet, agronomist, and professor.
 Julio Rodríguez - (b 2000) is a Dominican professional baseball outfielder for the Seattle Mariners
 Fernando Villalona - (b 1955) is a legendary Dominican merengue singer.

Sister City
On November 16th, 2020, Mayor Michael McPartland of the Borough of Edgewater NJ, proclaimed a Sister City relationship with Loma De Cabrera

References

Populated places in Dajabón Province
Municipalities of the Dominican Republic